The Secret of Skinwalker Ranch is a  reality television series that follows a team of scientists investigating phenomena they describe as unexplained surrounding Skinwalker Ranch, located in Uintah County, Utah, United States. The show began airing on the History Channel in March 2020 and to date has run for three seasons. 

Season 4 premieres April 18 2023.

Overview
The series is set at Skinwalker Ranch, a 500-acre ranch that is the site of reported paranormal and UFO-related activities, and follows a team of investigators and skeptics investigating the reports. Team members include Brandon Fugal, the ranch's owner, and aerospace engineer Travis S. Taylor.

The show features the team utilizing technologies such as ground-penetrating radar to investigate purported anomalies such as ionizing radiation, dire wolves, UFOs, a human bone discovered in an airtight cellar, and cattle mutilation. Guests on the show include Linda Moulton-Howe.

Cast

Ranch Investigators
 Travis S. Taylor, aerospace engineer
 Brandon Fugal, owner of Skinwalker Ranch
 Bryant "Dragon" Arnold, security chief
 Tom Winterton, ranch superintendent
 Jim Segala, skeptic
 Erik Bard, principal investigator
 Jim Morse, ranch manager
 Tom Lewis, ranch caretaker
 Kandus Linde, ranch caretaker

Guests
 Linda Moulton-Howe appeared in episode seven of season one investigating an alleged cattle mutilation.
 Rabbi Ariel Bar Tzadok appeared in the fourth episode of the second season.
 Ryan Skinner, author of Digging Into Skinwalker Ranch (2021), helped investigate rock carvings in season 2.
 James Keenan, a former military specialist appeared in season 2 recurringly as an investigator.
 Jenn Rook, station manager and radio DJ at Jack FM helps the team broadcast a strange signal they had received at the ranch.
 Former Governor Gary Herbert visits the ranch in the third season.
 Colonel John B. Alexander, who had previously investigated the ranch with Bigelow Aerospace, visits the ranch in the fifth episode of the third season.
 Seth Shostak informs the team of SETI's official protocols for verifying, validating, reporting, and responding to potential intelligent communications.
 George Knapp, investigative journalist and author of Hunt for the Skinwalker, joins the team in the ninth episode of the third season.

Development 
The series was developed by the producers of The Curse of Oak Island for the History Channel, which green-lit the show for air in 2019. The first season premiered on March 31, 2020 and ran for eight episodes, concluding on June 2, 2020. A second season was greenlit and began airing on May 4, 2021. Season 3 followed with more publicity on January 26, 2022.

Episodes

Series overview

Season 1 (2020)

Season 2 (2021)

Season 3 (2022)

Season 4 (2023)

See also
 Skinwalker Ranch
 Skinwalker Ranch (film)
 Paranormal

References

Further reading
Skinwalker Ranch - Spookiest Place on Earth
Robert Bigelow's Ranch
Archived Skinwalker Ranch Newspaper
Why a millionaire real-estate mogul bought Skinwalker Ranch 
Brandon Fugal – Supercar owner & Steward of Skinwalker Ranch
 University of Alabama in Huntsville scientists at Skinwalker Ranch

External links
 
 
 Mystery Of Utah’s Skinwalker Ranch Very Much Alive at KSL-TV
 History On Demand

Paranormal television
UFO-related television
2020 American television series debuts
History (American TV channel) original programming